Choestoe is an unincorporated community in Union County, Georgia, United States.

Choestoe is a name most likely derived from the Cherokee language meaning "Rabbit place."

Notes

Unincorporated communities in Union County, Georgia
Unincorporated communities in Georgia (U.S. state)